Ait Mait (Tarifit: Ayt Mayt, ⴰⵢⵜ ⵎⴰⵢⵜ; Arabic:  آيت مايت) is a commune in Driouch Province, Oriental, Morocco. At the time of the 2004 census, the commune had a total population of 7188 people living in 1224 households.

References

Populated places in Driouch Province
Rural communes of Oriental (Morocco)